The 2016 United States House of Representatives elections in Nebraska were held on November 8, 2016, to elect the three U.S. representatives from the state of Nebraska, one from each of the state's three congressional districts. The elections coincided with the 2016 U.S. presidential election, as well as other elections to the House of Representatives, elections to the United States Senate and various state and local elections. The primaries were held on May 10.

District 1

The 1st district encompassed most of the eastern quarter of the state and almost completely enveloped the 2nd district. It included the state capital, Lincoln, as well as the cities of Fremont, Columbus, Norfolk, Beatrice and South Sioux City. The incumbent was Republican Jeff Fortenberry, who had represented the district since 2005. He was re-elected with 69% of the vote in 2014. The district had a PVI of R+10.

Daniel Wik, a physician who specializes in pain management, was the Democratic nominee.

Democratic primary
Candidates
 Daniel Wik, Physician

Results

Republican primary
Candidates
 Jeff Fortenberry, (Incumbent)

Results

General election

Results

District 2

The 2nd district was based in the Omaha–Council Bluffs metropolitan area and included all of Douglas County and the urbanized areas of Sarpy County. The incumbent was Democrat Brad Ashford, who had represented the district since 2015. He was elected with 49% of the vote in 2014, defeating Republican incumbent Lee Terry. The district had a Cook Partisan Voting Index (PVI) of R+4.

Democratic primary
Scott Kleeb, a businessman who was the nominee for Nebraska's 3rd congressional district in 2006 and for the U.S. Senate in 2008, was speculated to challenge Ashford, a centrist Democrat, from the left. Kleeb ultimately did not run and Ashford won the primary unopposed.

Results

Republican primary
Former state senator and Douglas County Commissioner Chip Maxwell, who considered running as an independent against Terry in 2012, and retired United States Air Force Brigadier General Don Bacon ran in the Republican Party primary election. Salesmen Dirk Arneson from Omaha was a candidate, but he dropped out on September 3, 2015, and endorsed Bacon.

Candidates
Declared
 Don Bacon, retired Air Force Brigadier General
 Chip Maxwell, former state senator

Endorsements

Results

Libertarian primary

Candidates
 Jeffrey Lynn Stein
 Andy Shambaugh

Results

General election
The general election race was characterized as a tossup with the incumbent Ashford having a slight edge.

Polling

Results

District 3

It was mostly sparsely populated but included the cities of Grand Island, Kearney, Hastings, North Platte and Scottsbluff. The incumbent was Republican Adrian Smith, who had represented the district since 2007. He was re-elected with 75% of the vote in 2014. The district had a PVI of R+23.

Republican primary
Candidates
 Adrian Smith, (Incumbent)

Results

General election

Results

References

External links
U.S. House elections in Nebraska, 2016 at Ballotpedia
Campaign contributions at OpenSecrets

Nebraska
2016
United States House